Milton (historically Milton of Colquhoun) is a village in West Dunbartonshire, Scotland.

It previously had a primary school, closed in 2004. The first school was in what is now quite an old building on the road to Overtoun.  The second school building was on the main road, it was still open in the early 2000s.

Milton also has an SSPCA animal rescue centre. It also includes Dumbuck Quarry, which has removed a large part of Dumbuck Hill.

Its main claim to fame is that it was the home of Jackie Stewart, the racing driver.  His family ran the Dumbuck Garage in the village. 
Another native is Ian Napier, the fighter ace.

Milton House is an 18th-century mansion located on Milton Brae to the north of the village. It is a Category B listed building.

References

External links

Villages in West Dunbartonshire